Yuriy Rybin (born 5 March 1963) is a retired male javelin thrower from Russia. He set his personal best (86.98 metres) on 26 August 1995 in Nitra, and participated in the 1995 World Championships in Athletics.

Seasonal bests by year
1993 - 76.58
1995 - 86.98
1997 - 78.16
1998 - 83.08
1999 - 79.00
2000 - 77.58
2001 - 81.22
2002 - 74.70

International competitions

References

1963 births
Living people
Russian male javelin throwers
Goodwill Games medalists in athletics
Competitors at the 1994 Goodwill Games
World Athletics Championships athletes for Russia
Soviet Athletics Championships winners
Russian Athletics Championships winners